Lenman is a surname. Notable people with the surname include:

J. A. R. Lenman (1924–1985), British neurologist and medical author
James Lenman, British philosopher
Jamie Lenman (born 1982), English musician and illustrator

See also
Lehman (surname)